Vetri is a 1984 Indian Tamil-language action crime film directed by S. A. Chandrasekhar. Vijayakanth plays the lead role. The music was composed by Shankar–Ganesh. S. A. Chandrasekhar's son, Vijay, also plays a cameo role as a child artist, making it his first ever on-screen performance. The film was a remake of the director's own 1983 Kannada film Geluvu Nannade which he also later remade in Telugu as Devanthakudu (1984).

Plot

A student, Vijay (Vijayakanth), loves challenges and goes to any limit to win them. With an agreement with Arun, he captures Shanti (Viji) in a guest house for three days. Arun (Raja) is expelled from college by Professor Ramanajam (Vennira Aadai Moorthy). Lalitha (Vijayalakshmi) goes to the teacher's house and gets raped, then commits suicide.
 
Appusami, Lalitha's brother (Y. G. Mahendra), asks his friend Vetri to kill the teacher at home, while Arun listens to their conversation and rejoins them shortly thereafter. Vetri asks Ramanajam to pretend to have killed him. Arun arrives, and Vetri tells that Appusami asked him to kill for a challenge. Arun kills the teacher without anyone knowing it and escapes.

While Vetri is being prosecuted by the police, it is Arun's father, Dharmaraj (P. S. Veerappa), who reveals that he has been killed. He is also wanted for many years by Vetri, who killed his father (V. Gopalakrishnan). Vetri is accused in court, but he reports that when he was a child (interpreted by Vijay), he denounced P. S. Veerappa for an attempt on his father, but the judge did not act. Finally, the supreme court releases him, and Vetri is pardoned and was released.

Cast

Soundtrack
All songs were composed by Shankar–Ganesh.

References

External links
 

Films scored by Shankar–Ganesh
1980s Tamil-language films
1980s crime action films
Indian crime action films
Tamil remakes of Kannada films
Films directed by S. A. Chandrasekhar